Nonthrombocytopenic purpura is a type of purpura (red or purple skin discoloration) not associated with thrombocytopenia.

Nonthrombocytopenic purpura has been reported after smoking mentholated cigarettes.

Examples/causes include:
 Henoch–Schönlein purpura
 Hereditary hemorrhagic telangiectasia
 Congenital cytomegalovirus
 Meningococcemia

References

Further reading

External links 

Cutaneous conditions